Vilmar da Cunha Rodrigues (born November 2, 1982), commonly known as Sabia, is a Brazilian football player.

References

External links

1982 births
Living people
Brazilian footballers
Brazilian expatriate footballers
Expatriate footballers in Austria
Brazilian expatriate sportspeople in Austria
Expatriate footballers in Liechtenstein
Expatriate footballers in Japan
Brazilian expatriate sportspeople in Japan
Swiss Challenge League players
J2 League players
J3 League players
Sociedade Esportiva e Recreativa Caxias do Sul players
FC Lustenau players
FC Juniors OÖ players
FC Vaduz players
Tochigi SC players
Matsumoto Yamaga FC players
FC Machida Zelvia players
Association football forwards
Brazilian expatriate sportspeople in Liechtenstein